John Harvey sometimes Jack Harvey (1884-????) from Stoke on Trent in Staffordshire was a British professional road racing cyclist in the 1900s and 1910s. He held the National Cyclists' Union, 25 mile title in 1909 and was the English Champion for the one mile distance, in 1910.

Titles Held
 English NCU Champion (25 Miles) 1909, Open to the World
 English AAA Champion (25 Miles) 1911
 English AAA Champion (1 mile and 5 miles) 1910
 Northern Champion (1/2 mile and 1 mile) 1911
 Northern Champion (1/2 mile and 5 miles) 1910
 Midland AAA Champion (1/2 mile) 1911
 Midland NCU Champion  (1/4 mile) 1908
 Midland NCU Champion (25 miles) 1909

Personal life
Between 1910 -1913, he ran a pub called Old Blue Post Hotel in Stafford. He served in the Army in 1915 aged 31.

References

Year of death missing
British male cyclists
Sportspeople from Stoke-on-Trent
British Army personnel of World War I